Choral Arts may refer to:

 Choral Arts - An American choir based in Seattle, Washington
 Choral Arts Society of Washington
 Choral Arts Society of Philadelphia
 Baltimore Choral Arts Society